The Three Deaths of Marisela Escobedo is a 2020 documentary film directed by Carlos Perez Osorio and starring Juan Manuel Fraire Escobedo, Alejandro Fraire and Blanca Escobedo.

Cast 
 Juan Manuel Fraire Escobedo as Self - Son Of Marisela Escobedo
 Alejandro Fraire as Self - Son Of Marisela Escobedo
 Blanca Escobedo as Self - Marisela Escobedo's Sister
 Patricia González as Self - Chihuahua State Attorney
 Ruth Fierro as Self - Legal Representative Of The Escobedo Family
 Noel Rodríguez as Self - Public Prosecutor
 Leticia Carreón as Self - Friend Of Marisela Escobedo
 Arturo Nahle as Self - Zacatecas State Attorney
 Gabino Gómez as Self - Legal Representative Of The Escobedo Family
 Lucha Castro as Self - Marisela's Lawyer And Human Rights Defender
 Patricia Mayorga as Self - Journalist
 Carlos Spector as Self - Escobedo Family Lawyer
 Perla Márquez as Self - Public Defender
 César Peniche as Current State Attorney Of Chihuahua
 Andy Barraza as Sergio Barraza's Brother

See also
 List of original films distributed by Netflix

References

External links
 
 

2020 documentary films
2020 films
Netflix original documentary films